Ciyou Temple is a prominent Chinese temple in Songshan District, Taipei, Taiwan. The temple is dedicated to the Goddess Matsu. Raohe Street Night Market was located next to this temple as the temple has been a prominent landmark in the area.

History
The temple was constructed in 1753. According to legends the temple was founded by a wandering monk who came upon a group of Matsu devotees. Together they raised money for ten years and then built the temple.

Transportation
The temple is accessible within walking distance North of Songshan Station of Taiwan Railways.

See also
 Qianliyan & Shunfeng'er
 List of Mazu temples around the world
 Guandu Temple, Beitou District
 Bangka Lungshan Temple, Wanhua District
 Bangka Qingshui Temple, Wanhua District
 Dalongdong Baoan Temple, Datong District
 Xingtian Temple, Zhongshan District
 List of temples in Taiwan
 List of tourist attractions in Taiwan

References 

1753 establishments in Taiwan
Mazu temples in Taipei
Religious buildings and structures completed in 1753